The Yamaha 26 is a Japanese sailboat that was designed by the Yamaha Design Team as a cruiser-racer and first built in 1979.

Production
The design was built by the Yamaha Motor Company in Japan starting in 1979, but it is now out of production.

Design
The Yamaha 26 design was based upon Magician IV, a prototype boat that won the 1978 Quarter Ton class.

It is a recreational keelboat, built predominantly of fiberglass, with aluminum spars. It has a fractional sloop rig, a raked stem, a raised and squared-off reverse transom with an integral swimming ladder, an internally mounted spade-type rudder controlled by a tiller and a fixed fin keel. It displaces  and carries  of ballast.

The boat's galley is located on the port side of the cabin and includes a single-burner stove that  slides under the port quarter berth. The head has a privacy door and is located forward, just aft of the bow "V"-berth. Additional sleeping space is provided by two quarter berths, although the entire cabin can be used for sleeping space, using the seat-back cushions. A small table can be fitted on the starboard side and can be stowed when not in use.

The cockpit has two genoa winches, two spinnaker winches and a two more halyard winches on the cabin top. The mainsheet traveler is in the centre of the large cockpit. There are recessed genoa tracks inboard. A spinnaker was provided as factory standard equipment.

The design has a PHRF racing average handicap of 201 with a high of 192 and low of 215.

The boat was subject to a major design update, during production in 1982.

Operational history

In a review Richard Sherwood wrote, "Many aspects of the Yamaha 26 are unusual, and it almost appears that the designers decided to throw out all traditional ideas and design for function only."

See also
List of sailing boat types

Similar sailboats
Beneteau First 26
Beneteau First 265
C&C 26
C&C 26 Wave
Contessa 26
Dawson 26
Discovery 7.9
Grampian 26
Hunter 26
Hunter 26.5
Hunter 260
Hunter 270
MacGregor 26
Mirage 26
Nash 26
Outlaw 26
Paceship PY 26
Pearson 26
Parker Dawson 26
Sandstream 26
Tanzer 26

References

Keelboats
1970s sailboat type designs
Sailing yachts
Sailboat type designs by Yamaha Design Team
Yamaha sailboats